Catocala xarippe is a moth in the family Erebidae. It is found in Japan and the Russian Far East.

Subspecies
Catocala xarippe xarippe
Catocala xarippe okitsuhimenomikoto Ishizuka, 2009 (Japan)
Catocala xarippe santanensis Ishizuka, 2009 (Russia: Primorje)

References

xarippe
Moths described in 1877
Moths of Asia
Moths of Japan